Delhi Institute of Tool Engineering (DITE) is a government engineering college located campus in the Wazirpur and Okhla, New Delhi. It offers specialized programmes in Mechatronics, Mechanical Engineering and Tool Engineering.

Affiliation
The college is affiliated to All India Council for Technical Education (AICTE) and Delhi Skill and Entrepreneurship University and approved by Government of NCT Delhi.

References

External links
 Website
 Delhi Skill and Entrepreneurship University

Engineering colleges in Delhi